In enzymology, a leucocyanidin oxygenase is an enzyme that catalyzes the chemical reaction

leucocyanidin + 2-oxoglutarate + O2  cis- and trans-dihydroquercetins + succinate + CO2 + 2 H2O

The 3 substrates of this enzyme are leucocyanidin, 2-oxoglutarate, and O2, whereas its 5 products are cis-dihydroquercetin, trans-dihydroquercetin, succinate, CO2, and H2O.

This enzyme belongs to the family of oxidoreductases, specifically those acting on paired donors, with O2 as oxidant and incorporation or reduction of oxygen. The oxygen incorporated need not be derived from O2 with 2-oxoglutarate as one donor, and incorporation of one atom o oxygen into each donor.  The systematic name of this enzyme class is leucocyanidin,2-oxoglutarate:oxygen oxidoreductase. This enzyme is also called leucoanthocyanidin dioxygenase (LDOX) or anthocyanidin synthase (ANS).  This enzyme participates in flavonoid biosynthesis.

In a broader way, leucocyanidin oxygenase uses flavan-3,4-diols (leucoanthocyanidins) to produce 3-hydroxyanthocyanidins.  The gene encoding the enzyme (PpLDOX) has been identified in peach and expression has been studied in Vitis vinifera.

Structural studies 

As of late 2007, only one structure, in Arabidopsis thaliana, has been solved for this class of enzymes, with the PDB accession code .

References

Further reading 

 
 
 

EC 1.14.11
Enzymes of known structure
Flavanonols metabolism